A sepulchre is a type of tomb or burial chamber.

Sepulchre may also refer to:

 Sepulchre (comics), a fictional superhero 
 Sepulchre (novel), by Kate Mosse, 2007

See also

 Holy Sepulchre (disambiguation)
 Church of the Holy Sepulchre of Jesus, in Jerusalem